Sveti Martin pod Okićem is a settlement (naselje) in the Samobor administrative territory of Zagreb County, Croatia. As of 2011 it had a population of 258 people.

Notable people
Mihalj Šilobod Bolšić - Roman Catholic priest, mathematician, writer, and musical theorist of Šilobod nobility, primarily known for writing the first Croatian arithmetic textbook Arithmatika Horvatzka (published in Zagreb, 1758).

References

Populated places in Zagreb County